Leab may refer to:

People
 Daniel Leab (1936–2016), American historian
 Katharine Kyes Leab (1941–2020), American publisher

Places
 Albacete Airport, by ICAO code